Ned Charles (born 28 May 1957 in Mahébourg) is a Mauritian former professional footballer who played as a striker. He represented Mauritius national team nine times, scoring once.

Charles spent most of his career in Belgium, after Cercle Brugge had discovered him. Even though he would only stay for one season and play twice for the green and black side, he settled in the Bruges area. At the end of his active playing career, Charles became youth coach for local team SV Oostkamp and in a later stage Cercle Brugge and VV-Emelgem-Kachtem.

After a spell in France with USF Le Puy, Charles returned to Belgium, ending his career with two Walloon teams: UR Namur and Wallonia Walhain.

References
 Cerclemuseum.be 
 
 

Living people
1957 births
People from Grand Port District
Association football forwards
Mauritian footballers
Mauritius international footballers
Cercle Brugge K.S.V. players
Le Puy Foot 43 Auvergne players
R. Wallonia Walhain Chaumont-Gistoux players
Belgian Pro League players
Mauritian expatriate footballers
Mauritian expatriate sportspeople in Belgium
Expatriate footballers in Belgium
Mauritian expatriate sportspeople in France
Expatriate footballers in France